Along the Red Ledge is the seventh studio album by American pop music duo Hall & Oates. The album was released on August 21, 1978, by RCA Records. The biggest hit from the album was "It's a Laugh" (U.S. #20, Canada #23). The follow-up single was "I Don't Wanna Lose You" (U.S. #42).

The album foreshadowed what was to come in a few years for the duo, as they shed their previous producer Christopher Bond and went with a more polished sound with David Foster. Along the Red Ledge was the first studio album on which Hall & Oates used their road band (previously they had relied heavily on session musicians), a trend they would carry through their heyday of the early 1980s.

Former Beatle George Harrison played guitar on the track "The Last Time". Other contributors to the album include Rick Nielsen of the band Cheap Trick and rock musician Todd Rundgren. Robert Fripp of King Crimson played on the track "Don't Blame It on Love".

Track listing

Personnel 
The Band
 Daryl Hall – lead vocals (1-7, 10), backing vocals, keyboards, percussion
 John Oates – rhythm guitars, backing vocals, lead vocals (2, 8, 9)
 David Kent – keyboards, synthesizers, backing vocals
 Caleb Quaye – lead guitars
 Kenny Passarelli – bass
 Roger Pope – drums 
 Charles DeChant – saxophone

Additional musicians
 George Bitzer – keyboards
 David Foster – keyboards
 Steve Porcaro – keyboards
 Jay Graydon – guitar 
 Steve Lukather – guitar 
 Rick Nielsen – guitar 
 Todd Rundgren – guitar
 Dick Wagner – guitar
 George Harrison – guitar (3)
 Robert Fripp – guitar (7)
 Les Thompson – bass 
 Steve Forman – percussion
 Gene Page – string arrangements (4)

Production 
 Produced by David Foster
 Arrangements by Daryl Hall, John Oates and David Foster.
 Engineers – Humberto Gatica, Tom Knox and Ed Sprigg.
 Assistant Engineers – Chris Desmond, Mark Linett, Jon Smith and Patrick Von Wiegandt.
 Recorded at Davlen Sound Studios (North Hollywood, CA), Sunset Sound (Los Angeles, CA) and The Hit Factory (New York, NY).
 Mixed by Ed Sprigg at The Hit Factory  (New York, NY). 
 Mastered by Pat Martin at Sterling Sound (New York, NY).
 Studio Assistants – Glen Lee and Alan Davis
 Art Direction – Dick Smith
 Cover Design – Sara Allen
 Cover Photography – Eric Kroll
 Group Photography – Barbara Gray
 Management and Direction – Tommy Mottola

References

1978 albums
Hall & Oates albums
Albums arranged by Gene Page
Albums produced by David Foster
RCA Records albums